Nighasan  Assembly constituency is  one of the 403 constituencies of the Uttar Pradesh Legislative Assembly,  India. It is a part of the Lakhimpur Kheri district and one of the five assembly constituencies in the Kheri Lok Sabha constituency. First election in this assembly constituency was held in 1957 after the "DPACO (1956)" (delimitation order) was passed in 1956. After the "Delimitation of Parliamentary and Assembly Constituencies Order" was passed in 2008, the constituency was assigned identification number 138.

Wards  / Areas
Extent  of Nighasan Assembly constituency is Nighasan Tehsil; PCs Benoura, Mallbehar,  Ram Nagar Bagha, Gulariya T. Amethi, Ramiya Behar, Sujanpur, Jungle Sujanpur,  Semri, Chandpura, Sohariya, Tahara of Ramiya Behar KC & Dhaurahra NP of  Dhaurahra Tehsil.

Members of the Legislative Assembly

Election result

Bypoll 2019

16th Vidhan Sabha: 2012 General  Elections

See also

Kheri Lok Sabha constituency
Lakhimpur Kheri district
Sixteenth Legislative Assembly of Uttar Pradesh
Uttar Pradesh Legislative Assembly
Vidhan Bhawan

References

External links
 

Assembly constituencies of Uttar Pradesh
Politics of Lakhimpur Kheri district
Constituencies established in 1956